The Piano Concerto No. 2, W487, is a piano concerto by the Brazilian composer Heitor Villa-Lobos, written in 1948. A performance lasts about 28 minutes.

History
Villa-Lobos composed his Second Piano Concerto in Rio de Janeiro in 1948.

Instrumentation
The work is scored for solo piano and an orchestra consisting of piccolo, 2 flutes, 2 oboes, cor anglais, 2 clarinets, bass clarinet, 2 bassoons, contrabassoon, 4 horns, 3 trumpets, 3 tenor trombones, tuba, timpani, percussion (tam-tam, cymbal, bass drum), celesta, harp, and strings.

Analysis

The concerto has four movements:
 Vivo 
 Lento 
 Quasi allegro – Cadenza 
 Allegro
In the first movement, the solo part emphasizes parallel chord movements in both hands. The main theme has a modal colouring, and irregular metres occur throughout the movement.

The second movement has been described as "a sticky, humid nocturne furnished with a lush orchestral carpet, above which the piano leaps and tumbles through a remote harmonic maze of augmented fourths and tritones ".

The third movement is entirely taken up with a cadenza for the soloist, while the scherzo-finale has an energetic, Mediterranean-tinged first theme and a lyrical central section in the manner of a Brazilian modinha .

Discography
 Festival Villa-Lobos 1981; II Concurso Internacional de Piano: Obras de Villa-Lobos. Ciclo Brasileiro: "Impressões Seresteiras"; A Prole do bebê No. 2: "O Boizinho de Chumbo (Luiz Henrique Senise, piano); A Prole do bebê No. 2: "A Baratinha de papel" and "O Ursozinho de algodão"; Homenagem a Chopin (Maria Chaves, piano); Piano Concerto No. 2 (Krassimira Jordan, piano; Orquestra Sinfônica do Teatro Municipal do Rio de Janeiro, conducted by Mário Tavares). Recorded during performances at the Sala CeciÌlia Meireles and the Teatro Municipal do Rio de Janeiro. LP recording. Tapecar MVL 029. [Brazil]: Tapecar, 1981.
 Heitor Villa-Lobos: 5 concertos para piano e orquestra. Fernando Lopes, piano; Orquestra Sinfônica Municipal de Campinas; conducted by Benito Juarez. Recorded 18–24 June, 1984, in the Teatro Interno do Centro de Covivência Cultural da Campinas. LP recording, 4 discs: 12 inch, 33⅓ rpm, stereo. Energia de São Paulo: LPVL 01/25 – LPVL 04/25. São Paulo: Energia de São Paulo, [1984?].
 Heitor Villa-Lobos: Five Piano Concertos. Cristina Ortiz, piano; Royal Philharmonic Orchestra, conducted by Miguel Gómez-Martínez. Recorded at the Walthamstow Assembly Hall in October 1989, January and July 1990. 2-CD set: stereo. London 430 628-2 (430 629-2 and 430 630-2). London: The Decca Record Company Limited, 1992.
 Heitor Villa-Lobos: Cinco Conciertos para Piano y Orquesta. Elvira Santiago, piano (Concerto No. 1); Ulises Hernández, piano (Concerto No. 2); Patricio Malcolm, piano (Concerto No. 3); Harold López-Nussa, piano (Concerto No. 4); Roberto Urbay, piano (Concerto No. 5); Orquesta Sinfónica Nacional de Cuba, conducted by Enrique Pérez Mesa. Concerto No. 2 recorded at the Teatro Auditorium Amadeo Roldán, Havana, Cuba, 10 December 2003, part of the XXV Festival Internacional del Nuevo Cine Latinoamericano. 2 CDs + 1 DVD. Colibrí DVD/CD 050. Havana: Colibrí, 2006.

References

Coted sources

Further reading
 Appleby, David P. 2002. Heitor Villa-Lobos: A Life (1887–1959). Lanham, Maryland: Scarecrow Press. .
 Fortes Filho, Raimundo M. de Melo. 2004. “Concerto Para Piano e Orquestra n. 1 de Villa-Lobos: Um Estudo Analítico-Interpretativo.” Masters thesis, Universidade Federal da Bahia.
 Peppercorn, Lisa M. 1984. "Villa-Lobos's Commissioned Compositions". Tempo, New Series, No. 151 (December): 28–31.

1948 compositions
Compositions by Heitor Villa-Lobos
Villa-Lobos 2
Music with dedications